Willie Poching is a New Zealand professional rugby league football coach and former player. He is the former head-coach of Wakefield Trinity in the Super League. When he was appointed head coach of Wakefield, he became the first Samoan head coach of a first grade rugby league club. A former New Zealand, and Samoa international representative forward, he spent his career playing for clubs in New Zealand, Australia and finally England, winning the Super League championship with Leeds Rhinos in 2004.

Playing career

New Zealand
Poching played for the Northcote Tigers, Marist Saints and Mount Albert Lions in the Auckland Rugby League competition. He made the Junior Kiwis in 1991 and captained the side in 1992. He played in 4 games for Auckland between 1992 and 1993, before signing a junior contract with the Brisbane Broncos for 1994. During that year he toured New Zealand with Western Samoa and captained them in a game against a Manawatu XIII. Poching represented the Junior Kiwis in 1991 and 1992, captaining the side in 1992.

He joined the Auckland Warriors in 1995, however he only played two games for the club and was not re-signed for the 1996 season. Poching played for Western Samoa at the 1995 World Cup, and also captained Samoa during their 2000 World Cup.

England
Over his long career Poching played for the Wakefield Trinity (Heritage № 1144) (captain) and was a huge crowd favourite and club captain for his final season. He then joined the Leeds club in the Super League. Poching played for the Leeds side from the interchange bench in their 2004 Super League Grand Final victory against the Bradford club. As Super League IX champions, the Leeds club faced 2004 NRL season premiers, the Canterbury-Bankstown Bulldogs in the 2005 World Club Challenge. Poching played from the interchange bench, scoring a try in Leeds 39-32 victory. Poching played for Leeds side in the 2005 Challenge Cup Final from the interchange bench in their loss against Hull FC. He played his single game for New Zealand against England at Halliwell Jones Stadium, Warrington during the 2005 Tri-Nations campaign. Poching was forced to retire due to injury at the completion of 2006 season.

Coaching career
Poching was the academy coach at Leeds as well as the head coach of Samoa. He moved from Leeds to become assistant coach to Tony Smith at the Warrington club in the 2010 post season, and coached the team to win the League Leader's Shield in 2011, Challenge Cup in 2012, and to two Grand Final defeats in 2012 (to Leeds) and 2013 (to Wigan). Poching signed as assistant coach at the Salford side for the 2017 season. He later re-joined Hull Kingston Rovers and Tony Smith as assistant coach before returning to Wakefield Trinity as an interim head coach. Poching was named head coach on 22 September 2021 after a successful interim stint.
On 12 September 2022, Poching announced he was departing Wakefield Trinity.  The club finished 10th on the table and narrowly avoided relegation to the RFL Championship.

Personal life
Poching father Eddie was the first manager of the Samoa national rugby league team.

Poching gave son Kobe Poching, his Super League debut in the Boxing Day 2021 clash between Wakefield and Leeds.

References

External links
Leeds Rhinos profile
Profile at rleague.com
1999 RUGBY LEAGUE: TEAM-BY-TEAM GUIDE TO SUPER LEAGUE

1973 births
Living people
Auckland rugby league team players
Hunter Mariners players
Junior Kiwis players
Leeds Rhinos players
Marist Saints players
Mount Albert Lions players
New Zealand national rugby league team players
New Zealand people of Chinese descent
New Zealand sportspeople of Samoan descent
New Zealand expatriate sportspeople in England
New Zealand rugby league coaches
New Zealand rugby league players
New Zealand Warriors players
North Queensland Cowboys players
Northcote Tigers players
Rugby league players from Auckland
Rugby league second-rows
Samoa national rugby league team captains
Samoa national rugby league team coaches
Samoa national rugby league team players
St. George Dragons players
Wakefield Trinity coaches
Wakefield Trinity players